The Catalan Transversal Range (Serralada Transversal) is a system of minor mountain ranges at the eastern end of the Pre-Pyrenees, between the Osona and Garrotxa comarques. The existence of the Catalan Transversal Range has made communications in the northern areas of Catalonia difficult in the past, especially between Northeastern Catalonia (Catalan Coastal Depression, with cities like Girona, Figueres and La Jonquera) and Western Catalonia (Catalan Mediterranean System; Lleida, Cervera and further west to Aragón), a problem that has been partly solved with the development of the Eix Transversal.

Description
The Catalan Transversal Range is made up of a series of mountains running in a NW / SE axis between the Pyrenees, the Sub-Pyrenees, the Catalan Pre-Coastal Range and the northern end of the Catalan Coastal Depression. The highest point is at Puigsacalm, 1.515 m.

Its most characteristic feature is a small region of volcanic origin near Olot, Garrotxa.
There are extinct volcanoes like the conical-shaped Santa Margarida and Croscat, as well as basalt masses that originated in ancient lava flows at Castellfollit de la Roca.

Main mountain ranges
Puigsacalm (1.515 m)
Pla d'Aiats (1.306 m)
El Far (1.111 m) 
Finestres (1.027 m)
Sant Roc (591 m)

See also
Eix Transversal
Catalan Coastal Depression
Catalan Pre-Coastal Range
Pyrenees
Sub-Pyrenees

References

External links
From Girona to Sant Feliu de Guíxols

Mountain ranges of Catalonia